Comalapa is a municipality in the Chontales Department of Nicaragua.

Municipalities of the Chontales Department